Catocala wushensis is a moth of the family Erebidae. It is found in Taiwan.

The wingspan is about 74 mm.

References

Moths described in 1964
wushensis
Moths of Taiwan